Gyula Kánásy (22 October 1913 – 16 August 1984) was a Hungarian swimmer. He competed in the men's 400 metre freestyle at the 1932 Summer Olympics. He won the gold medal with the Hungarian team at the 1938 Men's European Water Polo Championship.

References

External links
 

1913 births
1984 deaths
Hungarian male swimmers
Olympic swimmers of Hungary
Swimmers at the 1932 Summer Olympics
People from Cegléd
Sportspeople from Pest County
Hungarian male water polo players
20th-century Hungarian people